Filburt Shellbach is a main and supporting character of the cartoon Rocko's Modern Life and the comic book series of the same name. He is an anthropomorphic turtle who is often pessimistic. In the Australian website of the television show, his name is sometimes spelled as Filbert  and sometimes as Filburt. In the comic book, his name is spelled Filbert. On the show's creator Joe Murray's website and in the episodes "Born to Spawn" and "Uniform Behavior", his name is spelled as Filburt. In the episodes "Born to Spawn" and "Fortune Cookie", he is referred to as Mr. Filburt Turtle. However, in the episode "High Five of Doom" Rocko and Heffer read in Filburt's diary that his full name is Filburt Shellbach, which was officially considered his real name. Mr. Lawrence provided Filburt's voice.

Whenever Filburt feels uncomfortable or disturbed, he is known to say, "I'm nauseous! I'm nauseous!". He also occasionally says, "Oh boy" and "Oh fishsticks." He also popularized the phrase "Turn the page, wash your hands," in reference to clammy hands being stained by poor quality comic book inks.

Filburt becomes age 21 in the episode "Born to Spawn".

Development
Joe Murray, the creator of the show intended for Filburt to be a secondary character used to "add texture" to Rocko and Heffer Wolfe. Mr. Lawrence, functioning as a director on the show sculpted Filburt into a main character befriending Rocko and Heffer.

Joe auditioned Mr. Lawrence in a large casting call in Los Angeles and chose him as the voice actor for Filburt. Joe stated that he did not expect for Mr. Lawrence's "east coast nasal to be perfect for Filburt."  

Martin Olson, a writer described the decision when Nickelodeon gave the "ok" for the marriage of Filburt and Paula Hutchison as one of the most memorable moments of the production. Martin said that the executives at first did not like the idea: linear character development did not exist in Nicktoons. Joe convinced the executives to allow for the marriage to occur.

Character
Filburt, described on the Nickelodeon Australia website as "nerdy" and "neurotic" bears many phobias. Filburt, a former "genius," "babe magnet," and "star athlete," became ruined by a case of "unrequited love." The Nickelodeon South East Asia website states "think of Woody Allen when you think of Filburt."

His birthplace is Kerplopitgoes Island (named after the Galápagos Islands). On his 21st birthday, he is required to go back to the island for a period of time.

Filburt and Paula Hutchison have four children: Gilbert, Shellbert, Norbert and Missy, whom all came from the same egg. Gilbert and Shellbert look Filburt while Missy looks Paula Hutchison. Norbert, on the other hand, has Filburt's eyes, but has a resemblance to Heffer, whom took on the job of "egg-sitting" for Filburt when they realized his rear was too hard for the task. Norbert also often thinks that Rocko is his father. Filburt holds the record number of jobs in the series: nine. These include a cashier at a grocery store, cashier at Kind-of-A-Lot-O'-Comics, license checker at the Department o' Motor Vehicles, film runner at the Googleplex Cinemas, lounge singer, Christmas tree salesman, photographer, cook at Stuff on a Stick and a food sample carrier. In one episode, it is shown that when between the jobs, Filburt apparently supports himself by recycling an enormous collection of empty cans in his trailer at the Patch o' Heaven Trailer Park. This prompted Rocko to comment, "So this is why he never works." According to geneal records of him, he is 44% percent Dutch, 43% French and 13% percent German.

In the comic book, Filburt does not meet Paula Hutchison. Instead, in the first story in issue #7, he meets a female turtle named Cindy at a comic book convention.

A running gag in the series is how multiple, mundane things give Filburt nausea. This is always followed with him saying "I'm nauseous, I'm nauseous, I'm nauseous.". In the end of the episode "Sailing the Seven Zzz's" while in a submarine, Filburt is about to say it, but Rocko and Heffer consoled and say "You're nauseous" at which point he says "right" and vomits. The other running gag is Filburt's constant and improbable run-ins with bad luck and calamity, which explains his neurosis and permanent state of great fear.

References

Rocko's Modern Life characters
Television characters introduced in 1993
Fictional turtles
Fictional singers
Male characters in animated series
Animated characters introduced in 1993